The Southern Swamps Byway is a Louisiana Scenic Byway that follows several different state highways, primarily:
LA 22 from Sorrento to Ponchatoula; and
I-55/US 51 frontage road from LaPlace to Ponchatoula.

References

Louisiana Scenic Byways
Tourist attractions in Ascension Parish, Louisiana
Tourist attractions in Livingston Parish, Louisiana
Tourist attractions in St. John the Baptist Parish, Louisiana
Tourist attractions in Tangipahoa Parish, Louisiana
Scenic highways in Louisiana